Strawberry Hill is a Georgian style farmhouse near Thurmont, Frederick County, Maryland, built in 1783.  The house is substantially similar in plan to nearby Pennterra, but lacks Pennterra's later Victorian additions. The locally quarried stone includes an unusual diamond pattern on the southeast side of the house.

Strawberry Hill was listed on the National Register of Historic Places in 1976.

References

External links
, including 2006 photo, at Maryland Historical Trust

Georgian architecture in Maryland
Houses completed in 1783
Houses in Frederick County, Maryland
Houses on the National Register of Historic Places in Maryland
National Register of Historic Places in Frederick County, Maryland